Jalal Bholana  is a village in Kapurthala district of Punjab State, India. The village is administrated by a Sarpanch, who is an elected representative.

Demography 
According to the report published by Census India in 2011, Jalal Bholana has total number of 219 houses and population of 1,028 of which include 548 males and 480 females. Literacy rate of Jalal Bholana is 91.91%, higher than state average of 75.84%.  The population of children under the age of 6 years is 89 which is 8.66% of total population of Jalal Bholana, and child sex ratio is approximately  1225, higher than state average of 846.

Population data

Air travel connectivity 
The closest airport to the village is Sri Guru Ram Dass Jee International Airport.

Villages in Kapurthala

References

External links
  Villages in Kapurthala
 Kapurthala Villages List

Villages in Kapurthala district